Jim Cowrey is Dead (German: Jim Corwey ist tot) is a 1921 German silent drama film directed by Edmond Gottschalk Stratton and starring Hedda Vernon, Otto Flint and Loo Hardy. It premiered at the Marmorhaus in Berlin on 12 July 1921.

Cast
 Hedda Vernon   
 Otto Flint   
 Loo Hardy   
 Gertrude Welcker 
 Heinrich Schroth   
 Fritz Schulz   
 Giuseppe Spalla

References

Bibliography
 Grange, William. Cultural Chronicle of the Weimar Republic.Scarecrow Press, 2008.

External links

1921 films
Films of the Weimar Republic
German silent feature films
German drama films
1921 drama films
German black-and-white films
Silent drama films
1920s German films